Surtout was a kind of overcoat. A "surtout" was a 17th-century term used to describe a coat worn over another coat, like a waistcoat. Surtout was a new name for it; prior to 1684, it was known as "Suravit" on account of Surhabit (overcoat).

Surtout is also a French term that translates as "above all."

Variations

New market surtout
Newmarket was a frock-styled overcoat. Newmarket Surtout was called after the city known for its horse races. The coat was worn while riding. It was styled with long skirted, double breasted and redingote cloak. The coat's collar was made of velvet.

New York surtout
New York surtout was a fashionable version for men. It was a short overcoat that had a wide collar that extends to the waistline and is hemmed with a wide black silk braid.

In popular culture
Charles Dickens refers to the character Mr. Micawber, who is wearing a surtout with black tights.

See also
 Wraprascal

References

 

Coats (clothing)